The annual Fred Mitchell Outstanding Place-Kicker Award (also known as the Fred Mitchell Award) is provided to the nation’s top collegiate place-kicker among more than 750 FCS, Division II, III, NAIA and NJCAA football teams.

The award is named for Fred Mitchell, the record-setting place-kicker, Wittenberg University Athletic Hall of Famer, author, philanthropist and Chicago Tribune sports columnist.

Criteria 
The recipient of the Fred Mitchell Award is chosen based on excellence on the football field and in the community.

Winners

Selection Committee 
A blue-ribbon Selection Committee] evaluates place-kickers that are nominated by their schools.

Members of the Pro Football Hall of Fame and/or College Football Hall of Fame on the Selection Committee include:
 Tom Beck: retired Head Coach of Illinois Benedictine, Elmhurst and Grand Valley State, College Football Hall of Famer (inducted 2004), board member for the National Football Foundation Chicago Metro Chapter
 Kevin Butler: place-kicker for the Chicago Bears and Arizona Cardinals, the only player to be inducted into the College Football Hall of Fame solely as a place-kicker (inducted 2001), played for the Georgia Bulldogs, named to the collegiate All-Century teams for Sports Illustrated and the Walter Camp Foundation
 Paul Hornung: 1956 Heisman Trophy winner, two-time All-American from Notre Dame, College Football Hall of Famer (inducted 1985), Pro Football Hall of Famer (inducted 1986), Green Bay Packers halfback and place-kicker
 Marv Levy: Pro Football Hall of Fame Head Coach (inducted 2001), Head Coach for the Buffalo Bills and Kansas City Chiefs, college coach at Coe College, Wyoming and Harvard, kicking teams coach for the Philadelphia Eagles, special teams coach for the Los Angeles Rams
 Steve McMichael: two-time All-American from the University of Texas, College Football Hall of Famer (inducted 2009), place-kicker and defensive tackle with the Longhorns, defensive tackle for the Chicago Bears and Green Bay Packers, head coach for the Chicago Slaughter (2009 Continental Indoor Football League Champions), board member for the National Football Foundation Chicago Metro Chapter
 Don Pierson: retired Chicago Tribune pro football sportswriter, member of the Pro Football Hall of Fame writers' wing
 Gale Sayers: Chicago Bears and Kansas Jayhawks running back, College Football Hall of Famer (inducted 1977), Pro Football Hall of Famer (inducted 1977), named NFL all-time halfback, NFL lifetime kickoff return leader, Sayers Corporation and the Gale Sayers Center
Former football players and others that are active in their communities are also on the Selection Committee including:
 Carl Allegretti: Chairman and CEO of Deloitte Tax, NFF Outstanding Contribution to Amateur Football Award, played football at Butler University
 Sergio Castillo: 2013 Fred Mitchell Award recipient from West Texas A&M whose 437 career points is the most in school, conference and Division II history
 Sean Gothier: National Football Foundation Minnesota Chapter Board President, Buffalo Wild Wings Citrus Bowl Team Selection Committee
 Teddy Greenstein: Chicago Tribune college football sportswriter, Heisman Trophy voter
 Randy Helt: record-setting place-kicker at Susquehanna University in 1988 and 1989, named to various All-American teams, one of three place-kickers invited to 1990 NFL Scouting Combine, instructor at kicking camps for Washington Redskins All-Pro kicker Mark Mosele
 Michael Husted: NFL place-kicker for 9 seasons and at the University of Virginia, Founder of the National Camp Series nationwide network of kicking coaches, kicking coach/consultant
 Dan Jiggetts: Ivy League Hall of Famer, captain of Harvard's football team, Chicago Bears offensive lineman, board member for the National Football Foundation Chicago Metro Chapter, Comcast SportsNet
 Chris Kearney: National Football Foundation Chicago Metro Chapter Board President, Buffalo Wild Wings Citrus Bowl Team Selection Committee, Tatum Managing Partner of the Central Region
 Rick Kolaczewski: National Football Foundation Chicago Metro Chapter board member and US LBM chief financial officer
 Conrad "Connie" Kowal: Libertyville Sports Complex, sports marketing executive formerly with the New Orleans Saints and Chicago Cubs
 Greg Loberg: Managing Partner and Founder of Loberg Miki O'Brien accounting and tax professional services firm
 Nick Lowery: Pro Football Hall of Fame nominee, Kansas City Chiefs Hall of Fame kicker, Dartmouth kicker, motivational speaker
 Tom Lynch: 2011 and 2010 Fred Mitchell Award recipient, place-kicker for 2011 NAIA National Champions Saint Xavier University
 Jeff Michalczyk: linebacker at Drake University, received the National Football Foundation St. Louis Chapter Scholar-Athlete Award, The Private Bank managing director
 Fred Mitchell: Wittenberg University Athletic Hall of Fame (inducted 1995), Chicago Tribune sports columnist and author
 Carol Monroe: Florida Citrus Sports Senior Director of Hospitality & Collegiate Conference Relations
 Mark Murphy: Green Bay Packers President, Team Captain on the Washington Redskins Super Bowl teams in 1983 and 1984
 Patrick Murray: Tampa Bay Buccaneers kicker, 2012 Fred Mitchell Award recipient whose 25 field goals at Fordham University in 2012 were just one shy of the all-time FCS record at the time
 Tom Obarski: 2014 Fred Mitchell Award recipient, record-setting kicker and punter at Concordia-St. Paul including 44 career field goals
 Rob Perry: Buffalo Wild Wings Citrus Bowl Team Selection Committee, high school football referee
 Michael Ritchey: National Football Foundation Chicago Metro Chapter board member, longtime Penn State football supporter
 Jeff Schebler: 2009 Fred Mitchell Award recipient, four-time All-American place-kicker from the University of Wisconsin-Whitewater, scored more points than any place-kicker in NCAA history at any level
 Caroline Schrenker: Indiana University Northwest Assistant Director of Community Education, Bears Care board of directors, board member for the National Football Foundation Chicago Metro Chapter
 Bob Thomas: kicked the winning field goal for Notre Dame to win the 1974 National Championship, NCAA Silver Award winner, Academic All-American, place-kicker for ten seasons with the Chicago Bears, kicked one season each for the Detroit Lions and San Diego Chargers, former Chief Justice of Illinois Supreme Court
 Wolfe Tone: board member for the National Football Foundation Chicago Metro Chapter, Herky Hawkeye mascot at the University of Iowa, Deloitte Tax Partner
 Todd Wilkins: place-kicker for the University of Wisconsin-Whitewater conference championship teams in the late 1980s
 Gary Zauner: place-kicker for the University of Wisconsin-LaCrosse, NFL and College Kicking Consultant and Special Teams Coach for 13 years in the NFL with Minnesota, Baltimore and Arizona
 Rob Zvonar: Head Football Coach at Lincoln-Way East High School, 2005 Illinois State Champions, 2007 Coach at the U.S. Army All-American Bowl

Recognition 
The Award's Watch List is released in August, top performers are recognized monthly during the college football season, and the winner (who is not required to be on the Watch List) is announced in mid-December.

The school of the award winner receives scholarship funds and the Fred Mitchell Award trophy is presented each February at the National Football Foundation Chicago Metro Chapter Awards Ceremony at Halas Hall.

About Fred Mitchell 
Fred Mitchell is a long-time Chicago Tribune sports columnist who enjoyed a distinguished career as one of the nation's first prominent small-college place-kicking specialists at Wittenberg University in Springfield, Ohio.
 
During the mid-1960s, Mitchell set the NCAA "College Division" record for career points scored by kicking while playing in the Ohio Athletic Conference for the legendary Bill Edwards, who later was inducted into the College Football Hall of Fame. Edwards had previously served as head coach of the Detroit Lions (1941–42) and as an assistant coach to Paul Brown with the Cleveland Browns. It was with the Browns that Edwards tutored Pro Football Hall of Fame kicker Lou Groza.

References 

 Senior placekicker from St. Ambrose presented the 2015 Fred Mitchell Award, Chicago Tribune

External links 
 Official website of Fred Mitchell Award
 American Football Kicking Hall of Fame

College football national player awards